Erwin Helfer (born January 20, 1936) is an American boogie-woogie, blues and jazz pianist.

Biography
Born in 1936 and raised in Chicago, Erwin attended New Trier High School in Winnetka, IL.  Erwin Helfer is a Chicago boogie woogie and jazz innovator, performer, and educator. Helfer was mentored by William Russell, who introduced him to Glover Compton, Baby Dodds, Mahalia Jackson,  Cripple Clarence Lofton, and Estelle Mama Yancey, as a young teenager growing up in Chicago in the early 1950s.

William Russell moved to New Orleans and worked on a Ford Foundation grant which led to the creation of the Jazz Archives at Tulane University. Helfer followed Russell to New Orleans and studied at Tulane University. He studied psychology but he did not complete a degree. He became close to Billie Pierce and De De Pierce. He spent time outside of class studying the piano style of Crescent City pianists Archibald and Professor Longhair.

In 1956, Erwin Helfer made the only recordings of house rent party pianist Doug Suggs and also recorded Speckled Red, Billie Pierce, and James Robinson (on the LP entitled Primitive Piano for his Tone Records and subsequently reissued by The Sirens Records SR-5005). Other tracks from the Speckled Red recording session were issued on Delmark Record's first release.

Helfer began his professional career when Estelle Yancey, wife of pianist and boogie-woogie pioneer Jimmy Yancey, coaxed him to fill in for her accompanist, Little Brother Montgomery. His initial performance with Yancey led to a long-term professional partnership with the singer, that lasted to her death in 1986 at age ninety.

In the 1960s and early 1970s, Erwin Helfer recorded for Chess Records, Testament Records, Flying Fish Records, Big Bear Records and various European labels. Peter J. Welding, one of the preeminent blues historians and scholars of all time, wrote that Helfer had "mastered the rhythmic and melodic subtleties" of the blues piano style.

In 1976, Helfer recorded Heavy Timbre - Chicago Boogie Piano for The Sirens Records; the recording session simulated a house rent party and included blues pianists Blind John Davis, Sunnyland Slim, Willie Mabon, and Jimmy Walker.

In 1982 Helfer partnered with Pete Crawford and started Red Beans Records, and released albums by Estelle Yancey, Blind John Davis, Johnny "Big Moose" Walker, and other Chicago blues artists. These recordings were sold to Evidence Records.

In 2001, Helfer began collaborating with The Sirens Records, which restarted in 2001. He was nominated for the Blues Music Awards in 2003, for 'Comeback Blues Album of the Year', for his album I'm Not Hungry But I Like to Eat - Blues. He has recorded St. James Infirmary, Careless Love, and Erwin Helfer Way for The Sirens Records.

Recently he has played at the Chicago Jazz Festival, 2005–2007; Debrecen Jazz Festival in Hungary, 2005, the Chicago Blues Festival, 1986-2010, and throughout blues clubs in Chicago.

Selective discography

References

External links
Erwin Helfer official website
The Sirens Records official website

1936 births
Living people
Blues musicians from Illinois
American blues pianists
American male pianists
American jazz pianists
Chicago blues musicians
Musicians from Chicago
20th-century American pianists
Jazz musicians from Illinois
21st-century American pianists
20th-century American male musicians
21st-century American male musicians
American male jazz musicians